The 2021 Western Premier League, also called the Burmac Western Premier League for sponsorship reasons, was the 21st season of the Western Premier League (WPL), the top football league in the Central West region of New South Wales. It was the second consecutive year that the competition ran, after an eight-year hiatus. Dubbo Bulls were the defending champions after defeating city rivals Macquarie United in the grand final at Apex Oval, whilst Macquarie United were the defending premiers.

The season saw the competition expand to nine teams for this season, two more than last year, with the addition of four-time champions Orange Waratahs, who last played in the WPL during the 2012 season, and Mudgee Wolves, who last played in the WPL during the 1997 season. 

The season was ultimately cancelled after 17 rounds due to COVID-19 lockdown and no title was awarded. At the time of the competition's cancellation, Orana Spurs lead the competition two points ahead of Orange Waratahs, with just one round to play before finals.

Season summary 

The 2021 season kicked-off with an Orange local derby when Orange Waratahs, who was making its return to the WPL, played Barnstoneworth United at Waratah Sports Ground. The match finished 1-all.

In July, following a COVID-19 lockdown for the Orange, Blayney and Cabonne local government areas, the round 15 match between Panorama and Barnstoneworth United was postponed, with Macquarie United and Parkes Cobras postponed too, as the latter had a number of players living or working in the Cabonne area.

The entire final round of the competition, scheduled to be played on 14 August, was postponed due to the COVID-19 lockdown in Dubbo. The final round was originally pushed back by one week but as the Dubbo lockdown continued and all of New South Wales was put into lockdown on 14 August, the competition was postponed indefinitely. After the announcement that the lockdown for regional New South Wales would be extended to September, the competition was ultimately abandoned on August 26. While Orana Spurs lead Orange Waratahs by two points on the ladder, no title was officially awarded.

Teams

Home venues and locations

Personal and kits

Regular season

Ladder

Results

Top goal scorers

References 

2021 in Australian soccer